Keith Alldritt is a contemporary British novelist, biographer and critic.

Biography
Aldritt was educated at Wolverhampton Grammar School and St Catharine's College, Cambridge. He lives and works in the West Midlands, the setting for his novels. For some years he was a Professor of English and American Studies at the University of Illinois and then at the University of British Columbia, Canada.
He has written extensively for radio, television and film and has contributed articles on modern and contemporary art to various magazines and newspapers in Britain, Canada and the United States.

He was made a Fellow of the Royal Society of Literature in 1978.

Awards 
His novel The Good Pit Man was a New Fiction Society choice.
For his biography David Jones-Writer and Artist he was elected to membership of the Welsh Academi.

Books 
 England Resounding - Elgar, Vaughan Williams, Britten and the English Musical Renaissance (Robert Hale 2019)  
 Vaughan Williams: Composer, Radical, Patriot - A Biography (Robert Hale 2015)  
 David Jones:Writer and Artist (2003)  
 The Poet as Spy: The Life and Wild Times of Basil Bunting (1998)  
 W.B.Yeats:The Man and the Milieu (1997)  
 The Greatest of Friends: Franklin D.Roosvelt and Winston Churchill, 1941-1945 (1995)  
 Churchill the Writer: His Life as a Man of Letters (1992)  
 Modernism in the Second World War: The Later Poetry of Ezra Pound, T.S.Eliot, Basil Bunting and Hugh MacDiarmid (1989)  
 Eliot's Four Quartets: Poetry as Chamber Music  
 Elgar on the Journey to Hanley: A Novel (1979)  
 The Lover Next Door (1977) 
 The Good Pit Man: A Novel (1976)  LCCCN 765367
 The Visual Imagination of D.H. Lawrence (1971) 
 The Making of George Orwell: An Essay in Literary History (1969)

References 
 Voorhees, R. J. "Justice to George Orwell" in Collected Essays: Journalism and Letters of George Orwell. Eds. Sonia Orwell and Ian Angus. Purdue University, 1970
 Workman, Gillian. Orwell Criticism, 1972
 Muller, James W. In Finest Hour: Journal of the International Churchill Society No. 77, 1992
 Cooper, John Xeros. T.S. Eliot and the Ideology of Four Quartets, Cambridge University Press, 1995
 Rae, Patricia. "Mr Charrington's Junk Shop: T.S. Eliot and Modernist Poetics in 'Nineteen Eighty Four'", Twentieth Century Literature, 22 June 1997
 Kleinzahler, August. "Blackfell's Scarlatti", London Review of Books, Vol. 21. No.2, 21 June 1999, pp. 30–31.
 Bryer, Jackson R. Sixteen Modern American Authors: A Survey of Research and Criticism since 1972 Durham: Duke University Press, p. 194. 
 Malcolm, Noel. "Poet of the Ever-Present Past". The Telegraph 11 May 2003
 Morley, Christopher. "Elgar and Wolverhampton Wanderers - an unlikely match", Birmingham Post Life and Leisure (Sport), 2 September 2010
 Cambridge Pre-U Syllabus. Recommended Reading Post 1960 Poetry.

British writers
Fellows of the Royal Society of Literature
Living people
Alumni of St Catharine's College, Cambridge
University of Illinois faculty
Academic staff of the University of British Columbia
People educated at Wolverhampton Grammar School
Year of birth missing (living people)